Jonathan Midol (born 13 January 1988) is a French freestyle skier and Olympic medalist. He was born in Annecy. He competed in ski cross at the World Ski Championships 2013, and at the 2014 Winter Olympics in Sochi, where he earned a bronze medal in ski-cross.
His brother is also a medallist skier, Bastien Midol.

References

External links

1988 births
Living people
Freestyle skiers at the 2014 Winter Olympics
French male freestyle skiers
Olympic freestyle skiers of France
Olympic bronze medalists for France
Olympic medalists in freestyle skiing
Medalists at the 2014 Winter Olympics
Universiade medalists in alpine skiing
Sportspeople from Annecy
Université Savoie-Mont Blanc alumni
Knights of the Ordre national du Mérite
Universiade bronze medalists for France
Competitors at the 2009 Winter Universiade